Pauline Louise Benattar (born 14 December 1988), better known by her stage name Louise Verneuil, is a French singer-songwriter.

Biography
Verneuil was born in the department of Ariège, Midi-Pyrénées. She has one sister. Her father, a pharmacist, enjoyed English-speaking artists including Elvis Presley, Johnny Cash, Bob Dylan, The Beatles and David Bowie, and taught Verneuil how to play guitar. Her Spanish mother, who died in 2018, listened to Gilbert Bécaud, Marie Laforêt, Barbara, Jean Ferrat, Serge Reggiani, Serge Gainsbourg, and Véronique Sanson.  

Verneuil's family moved to La Bastide-sur-l'Hers, Ariège when she was 18 months old, and owned a restaurant there. They moved to Golfe-Juan when Verneuil was eleven and she was educated at Lycée du Mont Saint-Jean (1998-2002) in nearby Antibes.  

After studying journalism at university, Verneuil spent time in Punta Cana, Dominican Republic before working in Paris as a publicist for a contemporary art gallery.  

She has been in a relationship with the musician Alex Turner since 2018.

Music career
After moving to Paris at the age of 22, Verneuil chose a stage name inspired by the name of her mother, grandmother and great-grandmother (Louise) and the street where Gainsbourg once lived (Rue de Verneuil). 

In 2012, when Verneuil was 23, she was a finalist on France's The Voice. She had never sung in front of an audience before and described Gainsbourg and Alain Bashung as her main influences. Her Voice mentor was Louis Bertignac, guitarist for the rock band Téléphone. 

Following her elimination in the quarter-finals, she recorded an album with Bertignac but did not release it. 

In 2013, she worked as a backstage reporter for The Voice. Verneuil then began performing live and co-wrote a song for Isabelle Boulay.

In June 2019, she released a self-titled EP, produced by Samy Osta.

In April 2020, she released her debut album Lumiere Noire also produced by Samy Osta. It features the songs from her EP and other songs including "Love Corail", "Emerencia", "Fugitif", "Lumiere Noire", "A mort amant" and "L'evadée belle".

As of June 2022 she has recorded and mixed a new album and is no longer signed to Mercury Records.

References

1988 births
21st-century French women singers
Living people
French women pop singers
French women singer-songwriters
French singer-songwriters
French people of Catalan descent
French people of Spanish descent
French rock singers